Charles Mutisya Nyamai is a Kenyan politician. He belongs to the National Rainbow Coalition (NARC) and has been elected to represent the Kitui West Constituency in the National Assembly of Kenya since the 2007 Kenyan parliamentary election.

References

Living people
Year of birth missing (living people)
National Rainbow Coalition – Kenya politicians
Members of the National Assembly (Kenya)